Tenaza Peak is a peak (1,345 m) located 2.5 nautical miles (4.6 km) east of Mount Pechell in the west-central part of Hedgpeth Heights, Anare Mountains, Antarctica. Mapped by United States Geological Survey (USGS) from surveys and U.S. Navy air photos, 1960–63. Named by Advisory Committee on Antarctic Names (US-ACAN) for Richard R. Tenaza, United States Antarctic Research Program (USARP) biologist at Hallett Station, 1967–68.

Tenaza spent the Antarctic summer of 1967–68 at Cape Hallet assisting in one research project (Thompson & Emlen, 1968) while simultaneously conducting his own study determining the importance of nest position and colony size in reproductive success of Adelie penguin (Tenaza, 1971).  Subsequently, Dr. Tenaza's field work was mainly with primates in SE Asia.  Dr. Tenaza is currently Professor Emeritus of Biological Sciences at the University of the Pacific in Stockton, California.

References 

 Tenaza R (1971) Behavior and nesting success relative to nest location in Adelie penguins (Pygoscelis adeliae). Condor 73:81-92
 Thompson, D. H., and J. T. Emlen. 1968. Parent–chick individualrecognition in the Adelie Penguin. Antarctic Journal of the United States 3:132.

Mountains of Victoria Land
Pennell Coast